Patrick Smage  (born 28 July 1990 in Elkhorn, Wisconsin, United States), is an International motorcycle trials rider. Smage is eleven times United States NATC Trials Champion and is the current champion. Patrick rides with his brother Phil Smage on the Smage Brothers Riding Shows. They competed on the sixth season of America's Got Talent in the middle of 2011 and made the finals finishing in the Top 10.

Biography
Smage first won the NATC Pro Championship in 2007 and has dominated almost every year since. In 2010 he was knocked back into 2nd place by Cody Webb but then regained his title in 2011.

At the start of the 2012 season, Smage won the El Trial de Espana event held by the SoCal trials association.

In 2016 he was again knocked back into 2nd place by Marc Freixa.

At the end of the 2017 season, Smage claimed his ninth US national title after a win and a second place in Rhode Island ahead of Montesa rider Marc Freixa.

In 2018 Smage once again started the season with a winner at the El Trial de Espana event in Southern California. During the season he won all 10 events in the NATC schedule and captured his 10th National Championship.

National Trials Championship Career

International Trials Championship Career

Honors
 US NATC Pro Trials Champion 2007, 2008, 2009, 2011, 2012, 2013, 2014, 2015, 2017, 2018, 2019

Related Reading
NATC Trials Championship
FIM Trial World Championship

References 

1990 births
Living people
People from Elkhorn, Wisconsin
American motorcycle racers
Motorcycle trials riders